The Minor Counties played in First-class cricket matches between 1912 and 1994 and List A cricket matches between 1980 and 1998. This is a list of the players who appeared in those matches.

A

B

C

D

E

F

G

H

I

J

K

L

M

N

O

P

R

S

T

V
 David Varey (1988): DW Varey

W

Y
 Doug Yeabsley (1974–1981): DI Yeabsley
 Stuart Young (1959–1969): SH Young

References

Minor Counties